The Palais Clam-Gallas is a palace in Neo-classical or Biedermeier style in Vienna, Austria. It was built in 1834 or 1835 by Prince  as a summer residence.

History

The Palais Clam-Gallas was built as a summer residence in 1834 or 1835 by Prince  in a park, laid out as an English garden, which had belonged to his family since 1690. The building is in Neo-classical style typical of the Biedermeier period. In 1850 the palace passed by marriage into the  family.

It was used by American troops following the Second World War. In 1952 the Clam-Gallas family sold it to the Republic of France. In 1954 the Lycée Français de Vienne was built on a part of the grounds. From 1980 it was the home of the Institut français de Vienne, the French institute of Vienna.

References

Clam-Gallas
Dietrichstein family